Sundown Saunders is a 1935 American Western film directed by Robert N. Bradbury.

Cast 
Bob Steele as Jim "Sundown" Saunders
Marie Burton as Bess Preston
Earl Dwire as Sheriff Baker
Ed Cassidy as Taggart
Jack Rockwell as Preston, Bess' Father
Milburn Morante as Smokey, Sundown's Sidekick
Frank Ball as Old Sour Face Manning
Hal Price as Lewis the Gambler

See also
Bob Steele filmography

External links 

1935 films
1935 Western (genre) films
American black-and-white films
American Western (genre) films
Films directed by Robert N. Bradbury
1930s English-language films
1930s American films